Nasser Hussain (born 9 March 1980) is the former Indian rugby union player and the former captain of the Indian National Rugby Union Team. He plays for the Bombay Gymkhana Club in Mumbai, India, and has also played abroad for Tynedale R.F.C. & Northumbria University in Newcastle upon Tyne, England. His international debut was on 26 October 1998 in Singapore against the host country. He is nicknamed as El-Nino. As of 2008, he has 26 test caps and has scored 16 tries for his country.

References

1980 births
Alumni of Northumbria University
Indian rugby union players
Living people
Rugby players from Maharashtra
Tynedale R.F.C. players
Indian expatriate rugby union players
Expatriate rugby union players in England
Indian expatriate sportspeople in England
Rugby union players at the 2006 Asian Games
Rugby union players at the 2010 Asian Games
Rugby sevens players at the 2010 Commonwealth Games
Commonwealth Games rugby sevens players of India
Asian Games competitors for India
Indian expatriate sportspeople in the United Kingdom